The Renault Scénic is a car which was produced by French car manufacturer Renault, the first to be labelled as a small multi-purpose vehicle (MPV) in Europe. The first generation was based on the chassis of the Mégane, a small family car. It became the 1997 European Car of the Year on its launch in November 1996.  In May 2022 Renault announced it was discontinuing the standard Scénic with the Grand Scénic following shortly after. It will be relaunched in 2024 as a fully electric vehicle.

The first generation Scénic added a four-wheel drive model called the Renault Scenic RX4, which was discontinued by the arrival of the Scénic II. The second, third and fourth generations have a model called Grand Scénic, which has seven seats rather than five. From the fourth generation (2016), the Scénic now utilizes three/four bench rear seats instead of three individual rear seats used in previous three generations, due to cost cutting measures.

First generation (1996)

The Mégane Scénic can be traced back to a concept car of 1991, the Renault S.C.E.N.I.C. (Safety Concept Embodied in a New Innovative Car) designed under the supervision of Anne Asensio, then designer at Renault. The production vehicle, the Mégane Scénic was launched in November 1996. It was marketed as a multi purpose vehicle, in a smaller size and lower price than such vehicles as Renault's own Espace. As its name suggests, the Mégane Scénic was mechanically identical to the Mégane hatchback (itself based on the older R19). The 1.4 L, 1.6 L "Energy", 1.8 L "F Type" petrol and 1.9 L diesel engines were shared with the hatchback range. The production model kept the independent seats of the concept car, but didn't offer sliding doors.

Renault decided to add an acute accent to the production model name (Mégane Scénic), in order to assert its European identity, in a context of growing competition of newer car manufacturers coming from Japan.

Renault underestimated the market demand that the Scénic would have — predicting that it would be a niche model with only 450 produced a day. Production at the company's Douai plant would eventually peak at nearly 2,500 cars a day.

Facelift
 

Along with the Mégane hatchback, the Scénic underwent a major frontal restyle in September 1999, and the newer 16 valve engines were introduced. The front end was quite a bit different from the Mégane counterpart, and there were also redesigned rear lights.

From the time of this restyle, it became officially known as the Renault Scénic, although a small "Mégane" badge still appeared on the rear door signifying the car's origin. Production ended in June 2003.

The Phase 2 allowed the Scénic to be separate from the Mégane and its predecessor by introducing improvements, such as a storage compartment on the dashboard, and a separate opening rear window on the tailgate.

Another small improvement with the Scénic were the rear head restraints, which were fixed over the back of the seat rather than being upright. This increased rear visibility.

Scénic RX4

Renault developed a four-wheel drive derivative of the original Scénic, the Scénic RX4, launched in 2000 in both LHD and RHD format. Featuring a viscous, multi disc central differential designed by Austrian specialists Steyr Daimler Puch, it offered part time four wheel drive. The rear suspension was re-engineered, the suspension was strengthened, the gearbox was redesigned to accommodate the four-wheel drive system, and the engine undercover was thickened and strengthened. The exterior was also changed, featuring plastic cladding around the entire car, a spare wheel on the tailgate, and different wheels from the standard Scénic.

The RX4 used five lug nuts, as opposed to four on the standard Scénic.

Also unlike the standard Scénic, the RX4 was only offered with a 5 speed manual transmission, with no automatic transmission available.

The new rear suspension now occupied part of the space that was used for the spare wheel well and led to the spare tyre being placed on the rear hatch, which was converted into a split swing out tailgate. To save weight, the redesigned tailgate was constructed from plastic, which meant the door was prone to cracking under its own weight with the spare wheel under normal use (becoming especially prevalent as the plastic aged). The RX4 rode higher with increased suspension travel and larger wheels than the Scenic.

While these changes provided better ground clearance, the RX4 was offered with 2.0-litre petrol and 1.9-dci diesel engines, both already known from the Mégane.

In most markets, the RX4 was offered in several trim levels, including the Sport Alize (2000), Privilege Monaco (2000), Expression (2001-2003), Dynamique (2001-2003), Salomon (2001-2003), Sportway (2001–2003), and Privilege (2001-2003). In less popular markets such as Australia, the RX4 was only offered the Expression and Privilege trim levels.

The RX4 was also offered with twin electric sunroofs, a luxury pack (including leather seats, climate control, and a CD player), a spare wheel cover, and roof racks as optional extras.

The RX4 sales made a good start (becoming France's best-selling 4wd vehicle in 2001), but sales rapidly declined due to poor gearbox reliability. Renault only produced 40,000 examples of the RX4, 5000 right-hand drive and 35,000 left-hand drive examples. Production was ultimately halted due to the arrival of the Scénic II and due to poor sales. Production of the RX4 ceased in December 2003, with no direct successor, most likely a result of the unreliability of the Steyr Daimler Puch 4wd system. It was eventually partially replaced in 2007 by the 2wd Scénic Conquest.

The RX4 sold particularly poorly in Australia, New Zealand, Japan, and Malaysia. Selling fewer than 500 units in each country.

As of 2021, approximately only 2500 (6%) of the original 40,000 RX4 examples remain on the road worldwide. Making the RX4 the second rarest Renault model of the 2000s, after the Renault Avantime.

Latin America 
From 1998 to July 2010, the Scénic was manufactured in Curitiba, Brazil, for South American markets. It was available with flex fuel engines. From 2006, an appearance package which added black plastic bumpers and fog lamps called the Scénic Sportway was produced. It was different from the European Scénic RX4.

It was also assembled in Mexico from December 2000 to mid-2004 at Cuernavaca Nissan plant. This was the very first cross-manufacturing operation between the two brands of the newly created Renault-Nissan Alliance.

Engines

Second generation (2003)

Shortly after the launch of the Mégane II, an all new Scénic was launched in June 2003. There was also a seven-seater Compact MPV Grand Scénic, with a longer wheelbase and rear overhang, which has two small child sized seats in the enlarged luggage area. The Grand Scénic was officially launched in April 2004.

As with the Mégane, the new car employs corporate styling cues and new technology, including the "Renault Card" keyless immobiliser and an automatic parking brake on certain trim levels. It integrates LEDs on all trims since 2006. As with the Scénic I Phase 2, a raised "Mégane" logo appears on the C pillar.

The car received a different dashboard design to that of the Mégane, and featured a fully digital electroluminescence instrument display.

The Scénic II includes folding rear passenger seats, each separately adjustable and removable. With integrated table, a folding front passenger seat (on certain trim levels), automatic headlights and windscreen wipers, 'Child minder' mirror, as well as front and rear electric windows.

Unlike its predecessor, the Scénic II was not available at any Yanase Co., Ltd. dealerships, as Yanase had ended its import rights for Renault after Renault had acquired a stake in Nissan when the Scénic I was still in production. Instead, the Scénic II was sold exclusively through Nissan locations.

Facelift
Like the Mégane a few months earlier, the Scénic II underwent a minor facelift with a revised grille, larger diamond badge, the addition of a "RENAULT" word badge on the bootlid and new wheel designs and interior trim. Sales commenced in September 2006.

Scénic Conquest

In June 2007, the spiritual successor to the RX4 was revealed in the form of the production ready Scénic Conquest. Although powered by two wheel drive, the Conquest has a body kit, raised ride height and features accessories usually reserved for SUVs.

Third generation (2009)

The Scénic III was released in July 2009, while the seven seater 'Grand' version (New Grand Scénic) was released in May 2009. Like the previous Scénic, there is also a seven-seater Compact MPV Grand Scénic. Renault also offers the Grand Scénic as a five seater.

Differences such as plastic cladding, raised suspension and different wheels to the normal spec Scénic.

Facelift

In January 2012, the Scénic and Grand Scénic was mildly facelifted with a new front end, new engines and a new digital instrument cluster design.

An updated Scénic and Grand Scénic were released in March 2013, which features a new interior and exterior styling and driver aids. At the same time, Renault introduced a crossover version of the Scénic, which was called the Scénic Xmod (Scenic Xmod Cross in Italy). The Scénic Xmod has different styling to the normal Scénic : larger and revised grille, roof racks, body protections, new tires and alloys, new paintwork and Xmod badges. It also features Renault Extended Grip enhanced traction control.

Both the Scénic and Grand Scénic can be specified with an Efficient Dual Clutch gearbox, mated to the 1.5dci (110 bhp) engine.

Fourth generation (2016)

A fourth generation Scénic was unveiled at the 2016 Geneva Motor Show. The car, based on the R-Space concept, is slightly larger than its predecessor, and adds some crossover design elements but, according to Renault, it is still an MPV.

It is powered by six diesel and two petrol engines. For the models with six-speed manual transmission and Energy dCi 110 diesel engines, it will incorporate an optional hybrid unit (Hybrid Assist). The Scénic will be offered with manual or double clutch gear box. The Scénic offer a 572 L trunk and the Grand Scénic 765 L with five seats.

The MKIV Scénic received a five star rating in Euro NCAP, with a range of standard active and passive safety features, including 'Active Emergency Braking System' with 'Pedestrian Detection' making the Renault Scénic the only compact MPV with this feature as standard.

The Scénic also features 'Lane Keeping Assist' and 'Fatigue Detection Alert'. Above 50 km/h, the Scénic can detect fatigue associated driving and alerts the driver, if the driver does not react, it is able to correct the trajectory autonomously.
 
In May 2022, Renault announced the short Scénic is to be discontinued, a few months before the Grand Scénic. The short Scénic production was stopped in July 2022, after 190,636 units produced.

Scénic in the United Kingdom
Sales of the Scénic in the United Kingdom began in May 1997, and for the first two years, the Scénic was the only compact MPV sold by a mainstream manufacturer in the United Kingdom, however the Vauxhall Zafira, Citroën Xsara Picasso, Fiat Multipla and the Nissan Almera Tino were launched in less than five years. In 1997, the Mégane Scénic was awarded the Car of the Year by What Car?.

The Scénic II arrived in showrooms in the country in September 2003. The Scénic III arrived in showrooms in the country in May 2009. The Scénic IV arrived in showrooms in the end of 2016 and UK sales were ended completely in 2019 due to declining popularity of MPVs there.

In October 2014, Top Gear Magazine placed the Scénic XMOD on its list of The Worst Cars You Can Buy Right Now. The facelifted versions could be specified with the R Link touchscreen system, that includes a digital radio.

Recall
Electronic defects have caused Renault to issue two recalls. The first, in October 2009, was because of the dashboard could stop functioning, leaving drivers without the ability to gauge their speed, fuel tank, direction indicators or anything as all instruments were totally electronic.

At first drivers had to replace this part at their own expense, but eventually, because of media pressure, Renault UK and Ireland said that they would reimburse customers up to a set limit. No reimburse was implemented by Renault in Finland where several independent workshops launched an affordable priced fixing of blanked Scénic panels.

The cause of the unexpected instrument panel blankening originated from some defective soldering which caused the power transistor to overheat and fail. The fault occurred in Scénic II cars made between 2003 and 2006. The second, in August 2010, was because the electric handbrake could sometimes engage on its own while the car was in motion.

Alternative propulsion
The Cleanova III, presented in the 2005 Geneva Auto Show, is based on a Scénic platform.

See also
Renault Modus, the mini MPV of the manufacturer
Renault Espace, the large MPV of the manufacturer

References

External links

 (UK)
 (Grand Scénic - UK)

Scenic
Euro NCAP small MPVs
Compact MPVs
Minivans
Front-wheel-drive vehicles
2000s cars
2010s cars
2020s cars
Cars introduced in 1996
Cars discontinued in 2022
All-wheel-drive vehicles
Cars of Brazil